Bruno Génard (born 22 February 1961) is a French modern pentathlete. He competed at the 1988 Summer Olympics, held in Seoul, South Korea.

References

External links
 

1961 births
Living people
French male modern pentathletes
Olympic modern pentathletes of France
Modern pentathletes at the 1988 Summer Olympics
Sportspeople from Villeneuve-Saint-Georges